Nagia natalensis is a species of moth in the family Erebidae. It is found in South Africa, Oman and Yemen (Socotra).

References

Nagia
Moths described in 1902
Moths of Africa